Parencoelia is a genus of fungi in the family Helotiaceae. The genus contains 4 species.

These species are:
 Parencoelia andina
 Parencoelia biparasitica
 Parencoelia kalmiae
 Parencoelia myriostylidis

References

Helotiaceae